The Critics' Choice Television Award for Best Structured Reality Show is one of the award categories presented annually by the Critics' Choice Television Awards (BTJA). In 2016, the category Best Reality Series was separated into two categories – Best Structured Reality Show and Best Unstructured Reality Show. The winners are selected by a group of television critics that are part of the Broadcast Television Critics Association.

Winners and nominees

2010s

Best Reality Series

Best Structured Reality Series

See also
 Structured reality
 TCA Award for Outstanding Achievement in Reality Programming
 Primetime Emmy Award for Outstanding Structured Reality Program

References

Critics' Choice Television Awards